Sheppard, Mullin, Richter & Hampton LLP, often abbreviated as Sheppard Mullin, is an international law firm headquartered in Los Angeles, California, with over 950 attorneys located in North America, Europe, and Asia. Founded in 1927, the firm includes 10 major practice areas ranging from Antitrust to Tax, and also industry-focused teams such as Entertainment, Healthcare, and Privacy & Security.

History

The firm was founded as Haight & Mathes by Bill Mathes and Raymond Haight in the Title Insurance Building, an Art Deco building in downtown Los Angeles. Haight's family name was already well known in the state: Henry Huntly Haight, 10th Governor of California (from 1867 to 1871), was his grandfather's cousin, and the influence of Henry Haight (1820-1869) in San Francisco led to Haight Street being named in his honor.

With the addition of James Sheppard (Mathes' law school roommate) in 1928, the firm was renamed to Haight, Mathes & Sheppard. The same year, the firm relocated down Spring Street to the Rowan Building.

From 1932 to 1963, the firm saw several key leadership changes: Haight left the firm in 1932, and J. Stanley Mullin and George R. Richter joined (initially as law clerks). In 1945, Mathes was appointed to the US District Court in Los Angeles by President Truman; his departure, and the previous addition of Gordon Hampton in 1938, led to the firm's current name: Sheppard, Mullin, Richter & Hampton.

In 1975 the firm outgrew its space in the Rowan Building and relocated to the Security Pacific Building (now the Bank of America Building). James Sheppard served as California State Bar President from 1960 to 1961 and died in 1964. By 2002, all the eponymous partners had died. The firm added 5 additional offices in California and in 2003 opened offices in New York and Washington, D.C. By 2017, it had expanded its nationwide offices and added international offices in Shanghai, Brussels, London, and Seoul, for a total of 11 US and 15 international offices .

Revenue and profitability

Sheppard Mullin has consistently ranked in the AmLaw Top 100 Law Firms by Revenue, as well as the AmLaw Top 100 Law Firms by PPP (Profits per Partner); in 2021, the firm placed within the top 50 by Revenue.

The firm has seen gross revenue increase year-over-year since 1990. In 2020, its total revenue increased to over $850m, and it exceeded $1 billion for the first time in 2021.

References

Law firms based in Los Angeles
1927 establishments in California